Big Sky Bible College was a private, fundamentalist college that existed in Montana during the 1970s and 1980s. The school utilized the cantonment area of the former Lewistown Air Force Station as its campus; the site is near the ghost town of Maiden, north of Lewistown in the Judith Mountains. The college is now defunct.

Defunct private universities and colleges in Montana